The Logiya, or Logia, is a river of east-central Ethiopia, a left tributary of the Awash River.

Course

The Logiya rises in the Ethiopian Highlands, then flows eastwards to join the Awash near Semera, below the Tendaho Dam.
It runs through flat lowland areas with mountainous boundaries in the Great Rift Valley of northeastern Ethiopia.

Watershed

The Logiya watershed is part of the Lower Awash River Basin (LARB). The upper part is in the North Wollo Zone of the Amhara Region. Lower down it is in the Afar Region.

The watershed is mainly arid lowlands, and has fluctuating temperature and rainfall. Ground cover includes grass steppe, shrub, tree steppe and bare soil with very sparse vegetation. The watershed suffers from severe degradation of the soil and desertification. However, particularly in the upper regions during the periods of high rainfall, it may be subject to flooding.

Hydrology

The main rainy season is from June to September. The dry season in from October to January and the small rainy season is from February to May.

See also 
List of rivers of Ethiopia

References

Sources

Rivers of Ethiopia
Awash River
Ethiopian Highlands